Antonovo is a rural locality (a village) in Novlenskoye Rural Settlement, Vologodsky District, Vologda Oblast, Russia. The population was 61 as of 2002.

Geography 
The distance to Vologda is 79 km, to Novlenskoye is 9 km. Volshnitsy, Panovo, Barsukovo, Svobodny Ugol are the nearest rural localities.

References 

Rural localities in Vologodsky District